The 1st Coupe de Printemps was a Formula Two motor race held on 31 May 1953 at the Autodrome de Linas-Montlhéry, in Montlhéry, Essonne, France. The race was held over 16 laps and was won by Marcel Balsa in a BMW Special.

Results

References

Paris
Paris
Paris